Mamram, abbreviation for Center of Computing and Information Systems ( Merkaz Mahshevim UMa'arahot Meida), originally Center of Computing and Mechanized Registration ( Merkaz Mahshevim VeRishum Memukhan) is the Israel Defense Forces' central computing system unit, providing data processing services for all arms and the general staff of the IDF.

History
Formed in 1959, the unit acquired its first computer, a US-made Philco Model 211 installed in 1961. Prior to this, the IDF made occasional use of the Weizmann Institute's WEIZAC, the first electronic computer in the Middle East. Mordechai Kikayon, a civilian, was transferred from RAFAEL (then part of the IDF) to be the Mamram's first commander. Mamram facilities soon started hosting several other independent data processing units, including the Inventory Processing Center (מענ"א) and the Manpower Computing Center (ממכ"א), and additional computers were obtained.

In 1994, the Mamram programming school, considered one of the best sources of high-quality software professionals in the world, was separated into a newly formed unit called School for Computer Professions (abbr. Basmach - בסמ"ח). However, the school's graduates, who were and still are highly sought after in the industry, are still referred to as Mamram graduates. Following graduation, Basmach students go on to serve in various IDF units. Some of the graduates are often offered a position in Mamram itself.

The unit has also been delegated with the responsibility of assigning Internet domain names under the idf.il second level domain.

On September 20th, 2017 the color of the unit's beret was changed to cyber blue to reflect the emerging responsibility for Israel's cyber defense.

Former commanders
2020–    : Colonel Yael Grossman
2018–2020: Colonel Omer Grossman
2015–2018: Colonel Talia Gazit
2013–2015: Colonel 
2010–2013: Colonel Noam Rozenfeld
2006–2010: Colonel  Ayala Hakim
2002–2006: Colonel Avi Kochva
1999–2002: Colonel Zvi Gliechman
1994–1999: Colonel Miri Kadmiel
1992–1994: Brig. Gen. Giora Ulman
1987–1992: Colonel 
1984–1987: Colonel 
1982-1984: Col. Avi Peri
1981-9182: Col. Sarya Ziv
1979-1981:Col Yeosef Shiftan
1978-1979: Col. Moshe Nadir
1973-1978: 
1967-1973: Menachem Dishon
1959–1967: Mordechai Kikayon, the first head of Mamram

Areas of responsibility

Closed intranet
Mamram has created the military's closed Intranet network. This network is a replication of the WWW, only in smaller dimensions for the use of all IDF's soldiers.

IDF's system network
MAMRAM is responsible for the management and development of the IDF's computer and network systems.

Fight against computer abuse
Mamram is responsible for enforcing computer use integrity. The ability to monitor network vandalism and abuse is an outcome of Mamram's own technical development.

WWW integration
Mamram provides IDF's WWW websites. Those websites contain interactive information used by civilians and foreigners.

References

External links
A Case Study of the Israeli Military's Impact on the Software Industry
Military units and formations of Israel
Military units and formations established in 1959
1959 establishments in Israel